The 1990–91 Oklahoma State Cowboys basketball team represented Oklahoma State University as a member of the Big Eight Conference during the 1990–91 NCAA Division I men's basketball season. The team was led by head coach Eddie Sutton and played their home games at Gallagher-Iba Arena. The Cowboys finished with a record of 24–8 (10–4 Big Eight) and won the Big Eight regular season title.

Oklahoma State received an at-large bid to the NCAA tournament as No. 3 seed in the East region. After defeating New Mexico in the opening round, the school's first NCAA Tournament win in 26 years, the Cowboys defeated NC State to reach the Sweet Sixteen. The run ended in the East regional semifinal, as Temple defeated OSU to reach the Elite Eight.

Roster

Source:

Schedule and results

|-
!colspan=9 style=| Regular season

|-
!colspan=9 style=| Big Eight Tournament

|-
!colspan=9 style=| NCAA tournament

Rankings

Awards and honors
Byron Houston – Big Eight co-Player of the Year

References

Oklahoma State Cowboys basketball seasons
Oklahoma State
1990 in sports in Oklahoma
1991 in sports in Oklahoma
Oklahoma State